Tasos Zachopoulos (born 4 February 1975) is a retired Greek football defender.

He started his senior career in Aris Thessaloniki. After three years as a backup player, he featured semi-regularly in the 1996-97 Alpha Ethniki. Stepping down to Aris' amateur side, he returned to the Alpha Ethniki in 1998 when contracted by Athens club Panionios. He played regularly there, and featured in all six matches of Panionios's 1998-99 UEFA Cup Winners' Cup campaign. In 1999 he nonetheless went on to Trikala.

References

1975 births
Living people
Greek footballers
Aris Thessaloniki F.C. players
Panionios F.C. players
Trikala F.C. players
Super League Greece players
Association football defenders